David D. Cooke (born September 27, 1963) is an American former professional basketball player who had a brief career with the National Basketball Association's Sacramento Kings. Born in Sacramento, California, he was a 6'8", 230 lb forward and played college basketball at Saint Mary's College of California.

Playing twelve games for the Kings during the 1985-86 NBA season, Cooke averaged 1.5 points and 1.7 rebounds per game.  He also played for the Wisconsin Flyers of the Continental Basketball Association that season.

Cooke attended Christian Brothers High School in Sacramento, California

References

External links
NBA stats @ basketballreference.com

1963 births
Living people
American expatriate basketball people in Argentina
American expatriate basketball people in Belgium
American expatriate basketball people in Israel
American expatriate basketball people in Spain
American expatriate basketball people in Switzerland
American expatriate basketball people in Venezuela
Basketball players from Sacramento, California
BBC Monthey players
Boca Juniors basketball players
CB Murcia players
Guaros de Lara (basketball) players
Liga ACB players
Power forwards (basketball)
Sacramento Kings players
Saint Mary's Gaels men's basketball players
Spirou Charleroi players
Undrafted National Basketball Association players
Wisconsin Flyers players
American men's basketball players
Hung Kuo basketball players
Chinese Basketball Alliance imports